Halesus may refer to:
 Halesus, mythological Greek character, see Halaesus
 Halesus (insect), genus of caddisflies